Gary Nylund (born October 28, 1963) is a Canadian retired professional ice hockey player who played in 608 National Hockey League games for the Toronto Maple Leafs, Chicago Blackhawks and New York Islanders.

Overview
Nylund was born in Surrey, British Columbia and raised in North Delta, British Columbia. He was selected third overall by Toronto in the 1982 NHL Entry Draft.

Nylund is notable for being the first NHL player to change teams via free agency when he left the Maple Leafs to sign with the Chicago Blackhawks in 1986.

Following his retirement, Nylund became a firefighter in Delta, British Columbia. He was awarded the Medal of Bravery in 2004 for his part in saving the lives of two fellow firefighters in a 2001 chemical fire at a paper mill on Annacis Island in B.C.

In addition to his work as a firefighter, Nylund is currently a part-owner and assistant coach of the BCHL Surrey Eagles franchise.

Career statistics

Regular season and playoffs

International

Awards
 WHL Second All-Star Team – 1981
 WHL First All-Star Team – 1982

References

External links
 

1963 births
Canadian firefighters
Canadian people of Swedish descent
Chicago Blackhawks players
Delta Suns players
Ice hockey people from British Columbia
Living people
National Hockey League first-round draft picks
New York Islanders players
People from Delta, British Columbia
Portland Winterhawks players
Sportspeople from Surrey, British Columbia
Toronto Maple Leafs draft picks
Toronto Maple Leafs players
Canadian ice hockey defencemen